Mohammad Vali Beyk (also Romanized as Moḩammad Valī Beyk and Moḩammad Valī Beyg) is a village in Dorungar Rural District, Now Khandan District, Dargaz County, Razavi Khorasan Province, Iran. At the 2006 census, its population was 129, in 33 families.

References 

Populated places in Dargaz County